Patchanka is the debut studio album by Mano Negra, released in 1988. The French edition of Rolling Stone magazine named it the 32nd greatest French rock album (out of 100).

Track listing

Charts

References

External links
 

1988 debut albums
Mano Negra (band) albums